Daniel Ruczko (born 3 July 1982) is a director, composer, writer and music producer.
He started producing music at the age of 12 on his Amiga 500 computer using the software Protracker, a couple of years later that lead to a career as an internationally known DJ and producer.

After spending most of his twenties releasing records on numerous labels and touring the globe as a DJ, in 2010 Ruczko went to a music school in Hamburg, Germany to become a Film Music composer.

In the same year he won an award for the concept of his short film "Bipolar - A Narration of Manic Depression" which was chosen by the German actor Matthias Schweighöfer. 

"Bipolar" got Daniel a lot of attention and also his first awards..

Throughout his creative career, Daniel has received over 60 awards for his films, three of which have been screened at the Short Film Corner of the Cannes Film Festival.

Ruczko works on commercials and music videos under his company name Misfit Media, as well as film projects under his company name Mind Pollution Pictures.

In 2018 Daniel moved to Los Angeles to work as a film director and producer.

He still composes and also produces all the music for a Hip hop group that he is a member of, together with the Rappers "Kayohes", "V3rb" & "Steez". He also still produces various styles of electronic music

According to IMDb Ruczko is currently working on a feature film with the writer Michael Reisz (Truth or Dare) that is believed to have a budget of 7 million dollars.

On October 31st 2022, Ruczko published his first book, an art book entitled "I Saw You In A Dream Last Night", with 320 pages and over 400 images created by Daniel.
Shortly after he also published a Christmas themed art book, called "Christmas Nightmare"

Short Film filmography

Film Accolades

Music Video filmography

Music

Musical beginnings
At the age of 8, Daniel learned to play the accordion, but gave it up after three years.

When he was 12 years old he started producing Hardcore Techno music on his Amiga 500 using Protracker, he later switched to the PC using FastTracker 2. In 1997 he bought his first set of Turntables and taught himself how to DJ.

In 1999 Ruczko got interested in Drum and Bass and decided to make that his new genre, at first he used Fruity Loops to experiment but pretty quickly found his new home in Steinberg Cubase, which is still his main Software for music today.

He established himself as a serious DJ and producer, known for his cinematic and dark sound, and played over 450 gigs in his DJing career.

Misfit Music

"Misfit Music" or "Rusher, Kayohes & V3rb" is a Hip hop group entirely produced by Ruczko, with him also directing their music videos. 
After releasing the single "Some Way, Some How / March On" on Origu in 2015, the group is in the process of finishing up their debut Album with the title "Ordinary Madness" which is expected to be released in 2019.

Discography as Rusher

Discography as Daniel Ruczko

References

 Voyage-LA-Interview 2021
 Neat-Video-Interview 2018
 Weser-Kurier-Interview 2018
 Weser-Kurier-Interview 2013
 Ruczko/Michael Reisz Project on ImdB
 Shoutout LA Interview 2021

External links 
 Official  Website
 
 
 Daniel Ruczko on Instagram
 Rusher on Discogs
 Rusher Fanapage

Mass media people from Bremen (state)
Horror film directors
Film directors from Los Angeles
German film score composers
Male film score composers
1982 births
Living people